Pimaric acid is a carboxylic acid from the resin acid group, often found in the oleoresins of pine trees. It can be prepared by dehydration of abietic acid, which it usually accompanies in mixtures like rosin. It is soluble in alcohols, acetone, and ethers.

See also
 Isopimaric acid

References

Carboxylic acids
Diterpenes
Phenanthrenes
Vinyl compounds